Captain Future is a pulp science fiction hero — a space-traveling scientist and adventurer —originally published in his namesake pulp magazine from 1940 to 1944. The character was created by editors Mort Weisinger and Leo Margulies. The majority of the stories were authored by Edmond Hamilton. A number of adaptations and derivative works followed. Significant was a 1978-79 Japanese anime (キャプテン・フューチャー), which was dubbed into several languages and proved popular, particularly in Spanish, French, German, Italian and Arabic.

Origins

Although sometimes mistakenly attributed to science fiction writer Edmond Hamilton, who indeed authored most of the Captain Future stories, the character was created by Better Publications editors Mort Weisinger and Leo Margulies during the 1st World Science Fiction Convention in 1939.

The original character was published by Ned Pines' Thrilling/Standard/Better publications company. A different Captain Future was published in Pine's Nedor Comics line.

Stories and art
The stories were published in American pulp magazines from 1940 to 1951, featuring bright-colored cover illustrations by Earle K. Bergey and two fellow pulp artists. Captain Future's originating adventures appeared in his namesake magazine, which ran from 1940 to 1944, coinciding with World War II. Bergey painted twelve of the seventeen Captain Future covers, and all ten subsequent Startling Stories covers under which additional Captain Future novels and novelettes were published. Of note, Bergey's art for Captain Future, beginning with the third issue, marks the start of his groundbreaking work in the fields of science fiction and fantasy illustration.

While the first four issues of the Captain Future pulp are subtitled, "Wizard of Science," the remaining thirteen issues bear the header, "Man of Tomorrow," shifting focus to the humanity of the titular hero, whose given name is Curtis Newton. A brilliant scientist and adventurer, Newton roams the solar system as Captain Future—solving problems, righting wrongs, and vanquishing futuristic supervillains. Published by Better Publications, an imprint of the expansive Thrilling Group of pulps, Captain Future gave readers the only explicitly science fiction and fantasy pulp hero in the history of American pulps.

The series makes assumptions about the Solar System which are outlandish by modern standards but which still seemed plausible, at least to most readers, when the stories were written. Every one of the planets of the Solar System, and many of the moons and asteroids, are suitable for life; most are occupied by humanoid extraterrestrials. The initial adventures take place in the planets of the Solar System. Later installments (after Captain Future invents the "vibration drive") take the hero to other stars, other dimensions and even the distant past and almost to the end of the Universe. As an example, they visit the star Deneb, who are the origin of Earth humans, as well as many other humanoids across the Solar System and beyond.

Story overview
Initially, the story was set in 1990. Hamilton quickly avoided exact dates except for past events such as the voyages of the astronauts who first landed on most of the other planets of the Solar System. In later stories, if the date was asked or revealed, it was done so discreetly.

The series begins when genius scientist Roger Newton, his wife Elaine, and his fellow scientist Simon Wright leave planet Earth to do research in an isolated laboratory on the Moon, and to escape the predations of Victor Corvo (originally: Victor Kaslan), a criminal politician who wished to use Newton's inventions for his own gain. Simon's body is old and diseased and Roger enables him to continue doing research by transplanting his healthy brain into an artificial case (originally immobile—carried around by Grag—later equipped with lifter units). Working together, the two scientists create an intelligent robot called Grag, and an android with shape-shifting abilities called Otho. One day, Corvo arrives on the Moon and murders the Newtons; but before he can reap the fruits of his atrocity, Corvo and his killers are in turn slain by Grag and Otho.

The deaths of the Newtons leave their son, Curtis, to be raised by the unlikely trio of Otho, Grag, and Simon Wright. Under their tutelage, Curtis grows up to be a brilliant scientist and as strong and fast as any champion athlete. He also grows up with a strong sense of responsibility and hopes to use his scientific skills to help people. With that goal in his mind, he calls himself Captain Future; Simon, Otho and Grag are referred to as the Futuremen in subsequent stories. Other recurring characters in the series are the old space marshal Ezra Gurney, the beautiful Planet Patrol agent Joan Randall (who provides a love interest for Curtis), and James Carthew, President of the Solar System whose office is in New York City and who calls upon Future in extreme need.

Captain Future faces many enemies in his career but his archenemy is Ul Quorn, who is the only recurring villain in the series and appears in two different stories. He is part Martian — therefore called the Magician of Mars — but also the son of Victor Corvo, who murdered the Newtons. Quorn is a scientist whose abilities rival those of Captain Future.

Stories

Characters 
 Captain Future Tall, athletic and handsome, with red hair, Captain Future was born on the Moon as Curtis Newton. After the death of his parents, he was trained by Professor Simon, Otho and Grag in all scientific and athletic pursuits necessary to fight crime and injustice across the Solar System.
 Prof. Simon Wright A human brain living in a transparent, nuclear-powered life support case, with tentacle-mounted optics. He is Captain Future's mentor and chief consultant in scientific matters.
 Grag and Otho Grag is a seven-foot-tall metallic robot. Otho is a white-skinned android. Both were created by Roger Newton with artificial intelligence and human emotions to be friends and helpers to mankind. Grag and Otho have a friendly rivalry. Grag is big and strong, but not very bright, while Otho is quick-witted, agile, and (with the aid of a special chemical) able to alter his physical appearance.
 Eek and Oog Grag and Otho's pets, respectively. Eek is a moonpup, a canine creature which does not need air to survive and consumes soft metals for food. Oog is an amorphous being called a mimic, an artificially created pet that can change its shape as Otho does. Both are telepathic, and are attached to their respective master.
 Joan Randall A beautiful female agent of the Planetary Police on Earth. She has brunette hair (or blonde hair in the anime adaptation). She shares a mutual romantic attraction with Curtis, but their respective duties prevent them from taking their relationship further.
 Marshall Ezra Gurney A high-ranking veteran officer in the Planetary Police.
 Ul Quorn Son of Victor Corvo, the man who murdered Captain Future's parents. A scientific genius, he has chosen to use his intellect for evil purposes.
 Johnny Kirk An orphan boy and a dedicated fan of the Futuremen. During his debut appearance in "The Magician of Mars", he impresses Captain Future with his determination to become one of his crew, and is later entrusted to Joan and the Planetary Police to be trained as a future crew-member. He has an expanded role and different name (Ken Scott) in the anime.

Technology 
Captain Future's spaceship, named the Comet, has been designed by himself and is superior to all other spaceships in the solar system. A research ship, the Comet has a compact on-board laboratory. It is also equipped with a camouflage device giving it the appearance of an actual comet, and armed with "proton cannons". She only receives faster-than-light propulsion late in the series of novels. In the animated series, she also has a small auxiliary shuttlecraft called the Cosmoliner.

Adaptations and other derivative works

Anime

In 1978, one year after Hamilton's death, Toei Animation produced a  anime television series of 53 episodes, based on 13 of the stories. Captain Future's later-iconic suit design itself was designed by Tadanao Tsuji. Despite the differences in cultural references and medium, the animated series was true to the original in many ways, from the didactic scientific explanations to the emphasis on the usefulness of brains as opposed to brawn.

The series was translated in several languages and distributed globally. The four episodes comprising the series' second story arc were dubbed into English and released on video by ZIV International in the early 1980s as The Adventures of Captain Future. In the late 1980s, Harmony Gold dubbed the series' initial four-part story as an edited "TV movie" simply entitled Captain Future, but with alterations regarding some character names (different from those in Hamilton's stories - whether for licensing law or other reasons, remains a broad field for speculation). A Blu-ray Box in Japanese only was released in September, 2016 (Box 1) and November, 2016 (Box 2). A German "Limited Collectors Edition" Blu-ray Box was released in December 2016, featuring not only the remastered Japanese uncut version (with German subtitles) but also the heavily cut German version.

While only eight episodes in total were dubbed into English, the series met huge success particularly in Japan, France, where the title and lead character's name were changed to "Capitaine Flam", in Italy with the translated title of "Capitan Futuro", in Latin America and Spain with the title "Capitán Futuro", in Taiwan with the title "太空突擊隊" ("Space Commando").  The Arabic-language version has the title of فارس الفضاء (Faris al-Fadha'a, or "The Knight of Space") and was broadcast many times during the 1980s.

The series was also broadcast in Germany, where it appeared under its original title. However, this version was cut by about a quarter of the original length, which mainly affected violent scenes or those considered "expendable" for the storylines.

Score 
The original incidental music was composed by Yuji Ohno, while the English-dubbed version had a new soundtrack composed by Mark Mercury. Mercury's work survived on the Latin American version, but a new opening was added for it, composed by Shuki Levy and sung by Chilean performer Juan Guillermo Aguirre (a.k.a. "Capitán Memo").

For the German version, a completely new soundtrack was created by German composer Christian Bruhn. To this day, the futuristic synth disco funk soundtrack is considered cult for giving the series the right feeling. A soundtrack CD was released in 1995. A remix of the theme Feinde greifen an ("enemies attack") by German DJ Phil Fuldner, called "The Final", entered the top ten of the German and Austrian single charts in 1998. The German publisher Bastei-Verlag released a Captain Future comic series with original adventures.

Episodes

Related works by Allen Steele
"The Death of Captain Future" (Asimov's Science Fiction, October 1995) is a novella by Allen Steele set in Steele's "Near Space" realistic near future setting of expansion into the solar system. Here, Steele contrasts the more gritty setting with the naïvety of the titular character. In story, a man named Bo McKinnon collects "ancient pulp magazines" and acts out a fantasy life based on the Captain Future stories. The novella won the 1996 Hugo Award for Best Novella. An audio drama version of the story appeared as a play produced by Seeing Ear Theater. "The Exile of Evening Star" (Asimov's Science Fiction, January 1999) continues and concludes the story. It includes many quotes from the original magazines.

Steele's Avengers of the Moon: A Captain Future Novel (Tor Books 2017) is a continuity reboot which gently updates the narrative (including the science) to fit with a more modern sensibility. It was authorized by Hamilton's estate. The novel features the main characters from the original stories and presents a new origin story for its protagonist. The Return of Ul Quorn, a quartet novella series published by the revived Amazing Stories magazine, followed as the sequel of Avengers of the Moon; the first entitled Captain Future in Love (2019), the second entitled The Guns of Pluto (2020), the third entitled 1,500 Light Years from Home (2021), and the fourth entitled The Horror at Jupiter (2021). The Guns of Pluto included a reprint of Hamilton's story "The Harpers of Titan" and 1,500 Light Years from Home included a long-lost musical parody.

Feature film 
In March 2010, German Director Christian Alvart (Pandorum, Case 39) secured the film rights for Captain Future and is working on a live-action adaptation in 3D.

In 2015, a short trailer of a CGI version of Captain Future by Prophecy FX was leaked. The trailer was said to be a study for a yet-undisclosed project. In March 2016, Chris Alvart confirmed in an interview on a RocketBeansTV podcast to have acquired the design rights from TOEI Animation so that the movie will have the look and feel of the animated series.

Other appearances
The Japanese TV series Captain Ultra, a placeholder series between two actual Ultraman series, was more or less a live-action adaptation of the Captain Future series (which has remained popular in Japan as well). The characters were all present, even if the names were changed.
In the TV series The Big Bang Theory, a Captain Future magazine cover is featured as a wall poster beside the entrance door in Leonard's and Sheldon's apartment.
In Cat Planet Cuties, Episode 9 features a well known song from the anime television series of Captain Future.
In the Pre-Crisis DC Comics, a character named Edmond Hamilton was featured as a minor adversary of Superman. This character, as a result of his homonymy with the science fiction author and his most famous work, took up the identity of Colonel Future and ended up battling Superman despite having heroic intentions. This character is a homage to the real Edmond Hamilton and his work in DC Comics.

Moons of Pluto
Calling Captain Future is notable for naming three (then undiscovered) moons of Pluto as Charon, Styx, and Cerberus after mythological characters associated with the Greek god Pluto. Three of Pluto's five moons were ultimately given the names Charon, Styx, and Kerberos (the Greek spelling of Cerberus).

See also
Captain Comet

References

External links
The Site of Captain Future (in French)
Haffner Press, publisher of The Collected Captain Future hardcover books
Edmond Hamilton on Captain Future
Robert Weinberg's Captain Future page
Futuremania, The Captain Future Fan Site (in German)
Captain Future bibliography at the Internet Speculative Fiction Database

Captain Future Convention 2010( 20th Birthday event of Curtis Newton Captain Future)

1978 anime television series debuts
Characters created by Mort Weisinger
Comics characters introduced in 1940
Fictional military captains
Fictional orphans
NHK original programming
Science fiction anime and manga
Science fiction characters
Fiction about the Solar System
Animated space adventure television series
Space opera
1979 Japanese television series endings
Japanese science fiction television series
Toei Animation television
American novels adapted into television shows
Anime and manga based on novels
Television shows based on American novels
Fiction set in 1990